Big Cedar Lake, a lake located in Washington County, Wisconsin, about a mile west of Little Cedar Lake, is the biggest lake of 52 in Washington County. It has 10.2 miles of shoreline and measures over 900 acres.

It is managed by the Big Cedar Lake Protection and Rehabilitation District (BCLPRD), a tax-funded governmental agency with seven commissioners. They provide maintenance, refuse and lake safety services.

Fish commonly found in this lake include Northern Pike, Large Mouth Bass, Panfish, and Cisco.

The Lake District takes part in Operation Dry Water, an annual initiative aimed at reducing the number of alcohol and drug-related accidents and fatalities and fostering a stronger and more visible deterrent to alcohol and drug use on the water.

References

Lakes of Washington County, Wisconsin